Ho Hsin-chun (born 18 December 1973) is a Taiwanese politician. A member of the Democratic Progressive Party, she has served on the Legislative Yuan since 2012.

Early life
Ho obtained her bachelor's degree from National Cheng Kung University and master's degree in women's studies from University of York in the United Kingdom.

Political career
Ho had served as the Greater Taichung councilor for the DPP. On Thursday September 22, 2011 Hung Yao-fu, the deputy secretary general of the DPP, announced that she was the victor, among five candidates, in a poll for a potential DPP candidate for the seventh district of Greater Taichung. She was to run against Cheng Li-wun, the KMT candidate.

Personal life
Legislator Freddy Lim of the 5th Constituency of Taipei City is also her younger maternal cousin.

References

1973 births
Living people
Democratic Progressive Party Members of the Legislative Yuan
Taichung Members of the Legislative Yuan
Members of the 8th Legislative Yuan
Members of the 9th Legislative Yuan
21st-century Taiwanese women politicians
Members of the 10th Legislative Yuan
National Cheng Kung University alumni
Alumni of the University of York